Vevring Church is a parish church of the Church of Norway in Sunnfjord Municipality in Vestland county, Norway. It is located in the village of Indrevevring. It is one of two churches for the Naustdal parish which is part of the Sunnfjord prosti (deanery) in the Diocese of Bjørgvin. The white, wooden church was built in a long church style in 1846 by the architect Hans Linstow. The church seats about 225 people.

History
The earliest existing historical records of the church date back to the year 1330, but the church was not new at that time. The first church in Vevring was likely a wooden stave church that was built during the 12th century. During the 1600s, the church was renovated and expanded. A new timber-framed nave was added on to the old church. The old nave was converted into the choir of the church and the old choir was torn down and its materials were used to build a church porch. In the 1770s, part of the church collapsed and had to be rebuilt.

In 1846, the church was torn down and replaced with a new church which stands on the same site. The new church was designed by Hans Linstow and the lead builders were Jakob Høyvik and Bendix Johannesen. The new church was consecrated on 16 September 1846 by the local dean, Johan Grønn Lund. In 1944–1950, the church was enlarged by the architect Lars Gjelsvik including small extensions to the choir and sacristy as well as rebuilding the second floor seating gallery. Electric lighting was also installed during this renovation. It wasn't until 1969 that the church received electric heating. In 1988, the church porch was enlarged to include a small kitchen and bathroom.

See also
List of churches in Bjørgvin
Informationen zur Orgel von der Firma Vestres Orgel- und Pianofabrik Haramsøy-Ålesund

References

Sunnfjord
Churches in Vestland
Long churches in Norway
Wooden churches in Norway
19th-century Church of Norway church buildings
Churches completed in 1846
12th-century establishments in Norway